QubicaAMF Worldwide is a bowling equipment provider. The company has U.S. headquarters in Richmond, Virginia and European headquarters in Bologna, Italy.

History

Qubica S.p.A. was founded in Italy in 1993 by Roberto Vaioli, Luca Drusiani, and Emanuele Govoni to "bring amusement innovations to bowlers and center proprietors worldwide."

In 2003 Qubica acquired the Mendes company, a maker of pinsetters, ball returns, and automated scoring systems.

QubicaAMF Worldwide was formed in July 2005 when AMF Bowling Worldwide contributed the assets of its Bowling Products Division and Qubica Lux S.à r.l. (successor owner of Qubica) contributed Qubica S.p.A. to a new joint venture of which each company retained 50% interest.

In March 2012 the joint venture entered into a non-binding offer with Bowltech International B.V. for the possible acquisition of the joint venture.

On July 1, 2013, AMF Bowling Worldwide was reorganized out of Chapter 11 bankruptcy and combined with Strike Holdings LLC (doing business as Bowlmor Lanes) to form Bowlmor AMF (now known as Bowlero Corporation). On July 31, 2013, QubicaAMF Worldwide announced that it was no longer for sale, stating that, “Under the circumstances a year ago, a transaction with Bowltech presented a great opportunity for QubicaAMF. However, with the full support of our new ownership team a transaction is no longer needed.”

In September 2013 the Qubica founders, as well as legacy partners Guido Sorba, Pat Ciniello, Frank Mascadri and Rich Albright, bought the remaining shares from the European private equity fund that co-owned Qubica, giving them 50% ownership of QubicaAMF. In December 2014 the Qubica founders and partners acquired the 50% owned by Bowlmor AMF (Bowlero), giving them 100% ownership of QubicaAMF.

In November 2016 QubicaAMF acquired CDE Software, a major developer and marketer of software to track leagues and tournaments.

References

Manufacturing companies established in 2005
2003 mergers and acquisitions
2005 mergers and acquisitions
2016 mergers and acquisitions
2005 establishments in Virginia
Italian companies established in 1993
Companies based in Bologna
Manufacturing companies based in Virginia
Ten-pin bowling equipment manufacturers